Adnan Ghaleb Melhem (born 29 April 1989) is a Lebanese footballer who plays as a striker for  club Tadamon Sour.

Club career 
On 7 June 2019, Melhem joined Tadamon Sour on a one-year contract. On 7 July 2020, Shabab Bourj announced the signing of Melhem on a free transfer, on a one-year contract. He scored 10 goals in the 2020–21 season, finishing as the second-top goalscorer, behind Hassan Maatouk with 14 goals, and helping his side avoid relegation. On 4 May 2021, Melhem returned to Tadamon Sour on a two-year deal.

Honours 
Ahed
 Lebanese Elite Cup: 2011
 Lebanese Super Cup: 2011

Individual
 Lebanese Premier League Team of the Season: 2013–14
 Lebanese Premier League top scorer: 2013–14

References

External links 

 
 
 
 
 

1989 births
Living people
People from Machghara
Association football forwards
Lebanese footballers
Al Ahed FC players
Racing Club Beirut players
Naft Maysan FC players
Salam Zgharta FC players
Tadamon Sour SC players
Shabab El Bourj SC players
Lebanese Premier League players
Lebanon international footballers
Lebanese expatriate footballers
Expatriate footballers in Iraq
Lebanese expatriate sportspeople in Iraq
Lebanese Premier League top scorers